Surveyor is a British professional weekly magazine for those in the public and private sectors providing technical services in local government.

The magazine has a history of more than one hundred years. It contains news and full-length articles on areas such as highways, traffic and transportation, planning, waste management and environmental control. It also carries recruitment advertising for the sector.

Despite its name,  'Surveyor'  does not actually refer to the surveyors in the construction industry, but took its name from the old title of county surveyor, which is now referred to as Director of Technical Services in UK local authorities.

The magazine has close link to the County Surveyors Society, which was established officially at a meeting of eleven county surveyors for England on 19 November 1885.

References

External links
 The Surveyor's official site
  Surveyor first published 1882
  Origins of Surveyors
 HathiTrust

1882 establishments in the United Kingdom
Business magazines published in the United Kingdom
Weekly magazines published in the United Kingdom
Magazines established in 1882